Batticaloa region ( Maṭṭakkaḷapput tēcam; also known as Matecalo; Baticalo; in colonial records, was the ancient region of Tamil settlements in Sri Lanka. The foremost record of this region can be seen in Portuguese and Dutch historical documents along with local inscriptions such as "Sammanthurai Copper epigraphs" written in 1683 CE which also mentions "Mattakkalappu Desam". Although there is no more the existence of Batticaloa region today, the amended term "Batti-Ampara Districts" also as “Keezhakarai” can still be seen in the Tamil print media of Sri Lanka.

History 
Ancient Batticaloa region spread south to Verugal Aru and north to Kumbukkan Oya. and some researchers lengthen it from Koneswaram to the north and Katirkamam to the south. Brahmi Inscriptions and ruins related to Megalithic period observed in Kathiraveli, Vellaveli, Ukanthai and kudumbigala are pointing out the antiquity of the Batticaloa region. Mattakalappu Purva Charithiram, the chronicle of Eastern Tamils, which was collected from palm manuscripts dated back to the 17th century CE, annotates the history of the kings who ruled this region with some historical background that is still in question. It narrates that this region was an ancient settlement of aborigines including Nagar, Thumilar or Iyakkar , and Vedar. Etymological research on some places such as "Nagamunai", and "Mantunagan Saalai" (present Mandur) indicated their association with Naga tribe of ancient Sri Lanka.

Mattakalappu Purva Charithiram also includes the settlements that arrived in this territory from various parts of present India in different time periods. The arrival of Virasaivite Priests for Nagarmunai Subramanya Swami Kovil from Srisailam of Andhra  is believed to be a contemporary of the Vira Saivite renaissance that occurred during the 12th century CE.

Capital 
It is said that Sammanthurai, a town in the present-day Ampara district, was the primary capital of the Batticaloa region until the colonial period. The Portuguese built a fort in 1628 against the union of the Kandy kings and Dutch merchants at Puliyanthivu, where present-day Batticaloa town is situated. However, the Portuguese were defeated in the war with the alliance of Kandyan and the Dutch East India Company in 1638, and the fort was captured by the Dutch. Since then, Puliyanthivu became the administrative capital of the district until the independence of the island in 1948.

Administration 
During the colonial period, the Batticaloa region followed Vannimai chieftainship same as in Vanni region of northern Ceylon. There were three or four Vannian chieftainships as observed by Portuguese historians like Bocarro and Queroz – Palugāmam, Panova, and Sammanturai along with Eravur. By the end of the eighteenth century, the Dutch colonial territories comprised eleven separate sub-chieftaincies, or as Dutch called them, "Provinces": seven Mukkuvar controlled districts of Eravur, Manmunai, Eruvil, Poraitivu, Karaivaku, Sammanturai and Akkaraipattu, plus Panama in the south, NaduKadu(or Nadene) in the west, and Koralai and Kariwitti to the north. totally eleven "provinces" were in Batticaloa territory. Nadukadupattu, the last pattu inhabited by the people who came from Sitawaka in the 17th century was abandoned by its inhabitants at the end of the 19th century and its residual populated area was later identified as "Wewgampattu". In the 1950s, there were nine D.R.O divisions (Divisional Revenue Officer Divisions – present Divisional secretariat Divisions) in Batticaloa District: Panamapattu, Akkaraipattu, Nintavur-Karaivakupattu, Sammanthuraipattu, Manmunaipattu North, Porativu – Manmunai South – Eruvilpattu, Bintennapattu, Eravur-Koralaipattu, and Wewgampattu.

Bifurcation of the ancient territory 
After independence, the Gal Oya scheme was proposed by the Dominion of Ceylon to increase the rice productivity of the southeastern part of the country in 1949, which caused the creation of many settlements in the Nadukadupattu region within the end of that scheme in 1953. According to the new proposal of electoral reforms in Ceylon in 1959, Nadukadu – Nadene pattus was introduced as a new electoral district with the name "Digamadulla" on 19 March 1960. At the end of 1960, Batticaloa District consisted of four electoral districts in its southernmost part – Pottuvil, Kalmunai, Nintavur, and Ampara.

Subsequently, the government declared a new administrative district including Pottuvil, Kalmunai, and Ampara electoral districts on 10 April 1961. Ancient Batticaloa region was thereby divided into two administrative districts where the northern part remained under the same name, and the southern part got a new name, "Amparai". According to the 1978 Constitution of Sri Lanka, the four single-member electoral districts of Ampara were replaced with one multi-member Digamadulla electoral district.

It could be noted that pattu divisions of the newly formed Batticaloa district remain in their old names, though they disrupted to following divisions in modern Ampara District.

Akkaraipattu – Divided into four divisions today; Akkaraipattu, Addalaichenai, Alayadivembu and Thirukkovil.
Panamaipattu – Lahugala and Pottuvil divisions.
Karaivakupattu – Navitanveli, Karaitivu, Kalmunai Tamil, Kalmunai Muslim and Sainthamaruthu
Sammanturaipattu – Sammanthurai, Irakkamam and Nintavur
Nadene -Nadukadupattu / Wewagampattu – Ampara, Damana and Uhana
 Bintennapattu – Pathiyathalawa(Bintenna West) and Maha-Oya (Bintenna East)

References 

Batticaloa
Ampara District